Orangozinho (Portuguese meaning Little Orango) is an island in the Bissagos Islands, Guinea-Bissau, it is part of the Bolama Region and the Bubaque sector. Its area is 107 km², its length is 19 km and its width is 11.8 km. It has a population of 706 (2009 census); the largest village is Wite. The island forms a part of the Orango National Park.

Neighbouring islands are Bubaque to the north, Roxa or Canhabaque to the northeast, Meneque to the west and Canogo to the northwest.

References 

Bolama Region
Bissagos Islands